Marville is a commune in the Meuse department in Grand Est in north-eastern France.

An airbase built by NATO hosted fighter squadrons from the RCAF from 1952 to 1967.

Geography
The village lies on the left bank of the Othain, which forms most of the commune's eastern border.

History
Marville was a part of the Duchy of Luxembourg until 1659. It was in this year that the first partition of Luxembourg was decided by the european great powers and thus Marville and the surrounding villages became part of the Kingdom of France.

See also
 Communes of the Meuse department

References

Communes of Meuse (department)
Three Bishoprics